Celestino Celio (20 May 1925 – 26 January 2008) was an Italian professional football player and manager who played as a midfielder. 

His younger brother Gastone Celio also played football professionally. To distinguish them, Celestino was referred to as "Celio I" and Gastone as "Celio II."

External links
 

1925 births
2008 deaths
Sportspeople from the Province of Rovigo
Italian footballers
Italy international footballers
Serie A players
Calcio Padova players
Genoa C.F.C. players
A.C. Milan players
A.S. Roma players
Inter Milan players
Catania S.S.D. players
U.S. Salernitana 1919 players
Italian football managers
Rovigo Calcio players

Association football midfielders
Footballers from Veneto